Tamil Nadu Electricity Board (abbreviated as TNEB) is a power generation and distribution company owned by Government of Tamil Nadu, India.  It was created as a regulated monopoly under section 131 of the Electricity Act (2003) as a successor of the erstwhile Tamil Nadu Electricity Board. It is the largest State Electricity Board (SEB) in the country in terms of number of consumers (30.75 million as of 31 March 2020).

History
TNEB was formed on 1 July 1957 as the Madras State Electricity Board according to the Electricity Supply Act of 1948 as a successor to the erstwhile Electricity Department of the Government of Madras under the authority of the Department of Power. It was responsible for electricity generation, distribution and transmission, and it regulated the electricity supply in the state. Later it was renamed Tamil Nadu Electricity Board.

In October 2008, the Government of Tamil Nadu decided to divide TNEB into two subsidiaries.  On 1 November 2010, TNEB Limited became a holding company with two subsidiaries, Tamil Nadu Generation and Distribution Corporation Limited (TANGEDCO), responsible for power generation, and Tamil Nadu Transmission Corporation Limited (TANTRANSCO), responsible for power transmission.

References

External links
 

Companies based in Chennai
State electricity agencies of India
Government agencies established in 1957
Electric power companies of India
Government-owned companies of India
Energy in Tamil Nadu
1957 establishments in Madras State
Indian companies established in 1957

ta:தநாமிவா நிறுவனம்